Barry Kenneth Cummins (born January 25, 1949 in Regina, Saskatchewan) is a retired professional ice hockey defenceman who played 36 games in the National Hockey League for the California Golden Seals during the 1973–74 season. The rest of his career, which lasted from 1969 to 1975, was spent in various minor leagues.

Career statistics

Regular season and playoffs

External links
 

1949 births
California Golden Seals players
Canadian ice hockey defencemen
Ice hockey people from Saskatchewan
Living people
Muskegon Mohawks players
Portland Buckaroos players
Regina Pats players
Saskatoon Blades players
Seattle Totems (WHL) players
Sportspeople from Regina, Saskatchewan
Springfield Indians players
Undrafted National Hockey League players